Nikola Bulatović (born June 14, 1971) is a Montenegrin professional basketball coach and former player, who is an current assistant coach for Podgorica of the Prva A Liga and the ABA League Second Division.

Playing career
Bulatović started his career in his hometown team Budućnost Podgorica. He was part of Partizan Belgrade squad that won national league and cup in 1994–95 season. He helped FMP Železnik to win their first national cup trophy in 1997 before returning to Budućnost, where he won two consecutive national titles. He returned to Partizan for the 2000–01 season before moving abroad, to Italian side Montepaschi Siena. He was the part of the side that won the last ever Saporta Cup trophy. Next season he played for Israeli side Hapoel Tel Aviv. In 2003 he signed for Greek club Apollon Patras but was released in August, before the season even started. Next few months he spent in Ukraine, in Azovmash Mariupol, before getting released in February 2004. Next month he rejoined his first club, Budućnost, but left soon without playing single game. He went to Romanian club CSU Asesoft Ploieşti where he was part of the squad that won EuroCup Challenge in 2005. Next season he started in Cyprus playing for AEL Limassol, in January 2006 he made a brief return to Asesoft Ploieşti, and month later he signed with Igokea from Bosnia. His last known club was Beovuk, a lower league club from Belgrade.

National team career
Bulatović won gold medals at both the 1997 European Championship and 1998 World championship with the Yugoslavian national team.

Coaching career 
In August 2019, Bulatović joined Lovćen 1947 as an assistant coach.

In 2020, Bulatović was added to the coaching staff of Podgorica as an assistant coach.

Personal life

Rape case
In 1998, Bulatović was charged with rape, a criminal accusation he was subsequently found guilty of in two separate trials. The event in question took place on 27 May 1998 in his Belgrade apartment where, as determined in two Belgrade  trials, the 27-year-old FMP Železnik center Bulatović raped the underage 15-year-old gymnasium student N.S. who showed up to his apartment with the intention of completing an earlier commenced interview for a school paper. She was of legal age of consent for sexual activity according to Serbian laws at the time. Bulatović pleaded not guilty, claiming the sexual intercourse with N.S. was consensual.

The first trial began in December 1998 in front of the Belgrade District Court and concluded with Bulatović sentenced to three years in prison. 

On appeal, the verdict was overturned and the new trial in June 2003 resulted in a 5-year sentence for Bulatović. Explaining the increased length of the second sentence, judge Dragoljub Albijanić—presiding over the Belgrade District Court judicial council that passed down the verdict—stated that the circumstances of the accused being a national team member when committing the crime as well as the victim suffering long term psychological effects were taken as aggravating factors. 

After another appeal, the case went before the Serbian Supreme Court where the lower court's verdict was confirmed in January 2006. With the dissolution of the Serbia and Montenegro state union later that year, the case was transferred to the newly independent Montenegro's judicial system in accordance with Bulatović's primary place of residence in Podgorica, Montenegro. Podgorica Lower Court thus became responsible for processing the stipulations in the verdict, but reportedly failed to do so in timely manner.

In May 2009, at the Belgrade District Court's urging—with Bulatović still a free man more than three years after the final verdict—an Interpol arrest warrant was issued for his capture.

After two and half years on Interpol's wanted list, Bulatović was arrested in Santo Domingo, Dominican Republic in December 2011. Within days, he was extradited to Montenegro where he began serving his 5-year sentence. He was released from Spuž prison in November 2015 having served four years and fifteen days, an early release reportedly due to the expiry of statute of limitations.

References

External links
Eurobasket.com profile

1971 births
Living people
Centers (basketball)
AEL Limassol B.C. players
BC Azovmash players
KK Beovuk 72 players
KK Budućnost players
KK FMP (1991–2011) players
KK Igokea players
KK Partizan players
KK Profikolor players
Mens Sana Basket players
Hapoel Tel Aviv B.C. players
Montenegrin expatriate basketball people in Serbia
Montenegrin men's basketball players
Montenegrin prisoners and detainees
Montenegrin people convicted of rape
People extradited from the Dominican Republic
People extradited to Montenegro
Sportspeople from Podgorica
FIBA World Championship-winning players
1998 FIBA World Championship players